Mankara  is a village and gram panchayat in Palakkad district in the state of Kerala, India.

Demographics
 India census, Mankara had a population of 17,787 with 8,624 males and 9,163 females.
This Grama Panchayat has a Family Health Center at Vellarode,a Government Homoeo Dispensary at Mankurissy (Kallur Road) and a Sidha,an Ayurveda Dispensaries each in State Government Sector for health care.

References

External links
 Mankara Railway Station 

www.homoeopathy.kerala.gov

Villages in Palakkad district
Gram panchayats in Palakkad district